Sansheng or San sheng may refer to:

Places
Sansheng, Chongqing, a town in Beibei District, Chongqing, China
Sansheng, Hubei, a village in Jianli County, Hubei
Sansheng Township, Shimen County, Hunan, China
Sansheng Subdistrict, Jinjiang District, Chengdu, Sichuan, China

Others
Three Departments, a top-level administration of middle and late imperial China
"Three Lives" (short story), a short story by Pu Songling from Strange Tales from a Chinese Studio (Volume 1)
"Three Incarnations", a short story by Pu Songling from Strange Tales from a Chinese Studio (Volume 10)

See also
Three Lives (disambiguation)